The Wexford County Board of the Gaelic Athletic Association (GAA) or Wexford GAA is one of the 32 county boards of the GAA in Ireland, and is responsible for Gaelic games in County Wexford. The county board is also responsible for the Wexford county teams.

Wexford is one of the few counties to have won the All-Ireland Senior Championship in both football and hurling.

The county hurling team last won the All-Ireland Senior Hurling Championship in 1996.

The county football team has won five All-Ireland Senior Football Championships, with the most recent win achieved in 1918.

History
Hurling has been played in Wexford from medieval times. Evidence of this can be found in the hurling ballads of the 15th and 16th centuries. The nickname "Yellowbellies" is said to have been given to the county's hurlers by Sir Caesar Colclough of Tintern in south Wexford, following a 17th-century game between a team of hurlers under his patronage and a team of hurlers from Cornwall, near Glynn in County Wexford. Others have said that King George III shouted "come on the yellow bellies" at an exhibition match near London, in which the Wexford hurlers were wearing yellow ribbons. Apparently, the real reason they are called the 'yellow-bellies' is because one D Coffey declared it back in 1982.

Football

Clubs

Clubs contest the Wexford Senior Football Championship. As of 2020, three clubs have eleven titles each.

No club has won a national or provincial title.

County team

Wexford had one of the greatest football teams in the history of the GAA in the 1910s, winning six consecutive Leinster Senior Football Championship (SFC) titles; it was also the first team to win four consecutive All-Ireland Senior Football Championship (SFC) titles. 1900 star James 'the Bull' Roche, who had fought for the World heavyweight boxing championship, trained that team, which featured Fr Ned Wheeler, Aidan Doyle and the O'Kennedy brothers, Gus and Seán, as players. The latter was the team captain. The feat of six consecutive Leinster SFC titles was only equalled in 1931, when Kildare won the sixth in a sequence that had begun in 1926.

Wexford's last major football success was winning the Leinster SFC title in 1945. From then on, the game of hurling took precedence in Wexford and as a consequence the fate of the Wexford footballers was to descend into obscurity for many decades.

Hurling

Clubs

Clubs contest the Wexford Senior Hurling Championship. The Rathnure club has the most titles.

Buffers Alley won the 1988–89 All-Ireland Senior Club Hurling Championship.

County team

Hurling is one of the most prominent sports in Wexford. This is in evidence in several one-sided results over the years: Kildare were beaten by 14–15 to 1–1 in an 1897 Croke Cup match. The Antrim team were beaten by 12–17 to 2–3 in a 1954 All-Ireland semi-final. Nicky Rackard, who scored 7–7 at that day, was Wexford's greatest hurler. He starred in two clashes with Cork in 1954 and 1956. Wexford lost the first after having a goal disallowed, but won the second with the combination of an Art Foley save and Nicky Rackard goal in the closing minutes.

In the 1970s, the distinctive red-haired Tony Doran was the star as Kilkenny and Wexford played ten Leinster finals in succession. In 1984 they claimed that the final whistle was blown prematurely when they were beaten by a single point in the Leinster final.

In 1996 Wexford, led by Liam Griffin and captained by Martin Storey, brought the Liam MacCarthy Cup back to Slaneyside for the first time since 1968; they were waiting 28 years. Cork, Kilkenny and Tipperary have dominated the honours in recent years.

Davy Fitzgerald took over as manager of the team for 2017, and made progress by reaching the Leinster Final for the first time in nine years. In the final they played Galway. Fitzgerald was appointed after the departure of Liam Dunne, who also played a huge part in their recent success.

Wexford's most recent hurling success was in the Leinster Final of 2019 when they defeated Kilkenny. In the Leinster semi-final, a draw in Wexford Park between Wexford and Kilkenny made it a rematch for the final. However, hurling in Wexford has been on the slide since 1996, their last All-Ireland success, and the Leinster title in 2004 simply papered over the cracks.

Camogie

After winning promotion from intermediate in the late 1950s, Wexford won their first All-Ireland Senior Camogie Championship in 1968, and won further All Ireland titles in 1969, 1975, 2007, 2010, 2011 and 2012. They contested the first National Camogie League final in 1977, won the second competition and returned to win it three times in a row between 2009 and 2011. Buffers Alley (5) and Rathnure (1995) have won the All Ireland Senior Club Championship.

Notable players include team of the century members Mary Sinnott and Margaret O'Leary, player of the year award-winners Bridget Doyle and Kate Kelly,
All Star award winners Áine Codd, Mags Darcy, Mary Leacy, Ursula Jacob. Una Leacy, Claire O'Connor, Catherine O'Loughlin, Katrina Parrock and All Ireland final stars Mary Walsh and Gretta Quigley.

Under Camogie's National Development Plan 2010–2015, "Our Game, Our Passion", five new camogie clubs were to be established in the county by 2015.

Wexford have the following achievements in camogie.
All-Ireland Senior Camogie Championships: 7
(click on year for team line-outs) 1968, 1969, 1975, 2007, 2010, 2011, 2012
All-Ireland Intermediate Camogie Championships: 1
2011
All-Ireland Junior Camogie Championships: 1
2021
All-Ireland Minor Camogie Championships: 1
1995
National Camogie Leagues: 4
(click on year for team line-outs) 1977, 2009, 2010 and 2011

Ladies' football
Wexford have the following achievements in ladies' football.
All-Ireland Senior Ladies' Football Championship Finalists: 3
1983, 1986, 1989
All-Ireland Junior Ladies' Football Championship Finalists: 2
 1986, 1987
All-Ireland Junior Ladies' Football Championship Winners: 1
2014 
All-Ireland Intermediate Ladies' Football Championship Finalists: 1
2007
All-Ireland Under-18 Ladies' Football Championships: 4
1982, 1983, 1984, 1986
All-Ireland Under-16 Ladies' Football Championship: 3
1981, 1982, 1983
All-Ireland Under-14 Ladies' Football Championship: 1
1990

References

External links

 Wexford GAA site
 Wexford on Hoganstand.com
 National and provincial titles won by Wexford teams
 Club championship winners
 Wexford GAA Discussion Board

 
Gaelic games governing bodies in Leinster
Leinster GAA
Sport in County Wexford